Coton is a hamlet in the English county of Staffordshire.

It lies on the A518 road some two miles west of Gnosall.

See also
Listed buildings in Gnosall

References

External links 

Hamlets in Staffordshire
Borough of Stafford